Josef Burg (May 30, 1912 – August 10, 2009) was an award-winning Jewish Soviet Yiddish writer, author, publisher and journalist.

Biography
Burg was born on May 30, 1912, in the town of Vyzhnytsia, in the region of Bukovina, Austria-Hungary. In the years before World War I, the city of Chernivtsi, also called Czernowitz in both German and Yiddish, was the capital of the Bukovina region and a center of Yiddish language and culture. The region became part of Romania following World War I.

Burg published his first professional writing in the Chernovitser Bleter, a Yiddish newspaper, in 1934. The Romanian government closed and banned the Chernovitser Bleter in 1938, on charges of Bolshevik propaganda.

Burg survived the Holocaust during World War II, but lost his entire family. He took refuge in the Soviet Union.

Burg continued to write and publish his works well into his 90s.  In 1990, Burg revived the once banned Chernovitser Bleter newspaper as a monthly publication.

Josef Burg died of a stroke on August 10, 2009, in Chernivtsi, Ukraine, at the age of 97.

Awards
 Segal Prize (Israel, 1992) for Yiddish writings
 Honoured Worker of Culture of Ukraine (1993)
 Honorary Citizen of Chernivtsi (1997)
 Gold Medal of Honour for Services to the Republic of Austria (2002)
 Austrian Cross of Honour for Science and Art, 1st class (2007)
 Theodor Kramer Prize (Austria, 2009)

Works
 1934: Afn splav
 1939: Afn tshermush [On the Czeremosz river] (German: Auf dem Czeremosz: Erzählungen. Boldt, 2005)
 1940: Sam [Poison] (German: Gift: zwei Erzählungen. Translated by Armin Eidherr. Boldt, 2005. )
 1980: Dos leben geyt vayter. Dertseylungen, noveln, skitsn  [Life goes on further: Stories, novellas, sketches]. Sowetski Pissatel 
 1983: Iberuf fun tsaytn. [Roll-call of the times]. Sowetski Pissatel
 1988: Ein Gesang über allen Gesängen: Erzählungen und Skizzen.
 1990: A farshpetikter ekho [A late echo] (German: Ein verspätetes Echo. Partly bilingual. 1999. )
 1997: Tsvey veltn [Two worlds]
 1997: Zevikelte stetshkes (Ukrainian original edition)
 2000: Irrfahrten. Boldt. 
 2004: Sterne altern nicht. Ausgewählte Erzählungen. Boldt, 
 2005: Dämmerung. Erzählungen. Boldt, 
 2006: Mein Czernowitz. Boldt, 
 2006: Begegnungen – eine Karpatenreise. Boldt, 
 2007: Über jiddische Dichter. Erinnerungen. Boldt, 
 2008: Ein Stück trockenes Brot.'' Ausgewählte Erzählungen. Boldt,

References

External links
 New York Times: Josef Burg, Who Wrote About Jewish Life, Dies at 97 
 2004 interview with Josef Burg at Google Videos 

1912 births
2009 deaths
People from Vyzhnytsia
People from the Duchy of Bukovina
Bukovina Jews
Yiddish-language writers
Jewish Ukrainian writers
Jews who emigrated to escape Nazism
Commanders Crosses of the Order of Merit of the Federal Republic of Germany
Recipients of the Austrian Cross of Honour for Science and Art, 1st class
Recipients of the Medal for Services to the Republic of Austria
20th-century Ukrainian writers
21st-century Ukrainian writers